Peter Niemeyer (born 22 November 1983) is a German football manager, executive, and former player. He serves as the sporting director of Preußen Münster. During his playing career, he mainly featured as a defensive midfielder, he also operated as a central defender.

Club career
Although born in Germany, Niemeyer spent the first years of his professional career in the Netherlands, playing for FC Twente in the Eredivisie. In January 2007, he joined Bundesliga side Werder Bremen, appearing in three league games for the main squad in the 2006–07 season.

On 29 September 2007, Niemeyer participated in the 8–1 home crushing of Arminia Bielefeld, scoring the game opener and his first Bundesliga goal. Incidentally, he fell out with an injury in the match after just 33 minutes.

In the 2008–09 season, Niemeyer appeared in a career-best 25 official games, including five in the UEFA Cup, as Werder reached the final against Shakhtar Donetsk, where he started in a 2–1 overtime loss.

On 9 August 2010, Niemeyer moved on loan to Hertha BSC, who were relegated to the second division the season before.

On 3 August 2015, Niemeyer signed for recently promoted SV Darmstadt 98 in the Bundesliga on a three-year deal. On 1 September 2018, after the closing of the 2018 summer transfer window, he announced he had not received an offer to renew his contract and would leave the club. He retired from football shortly afterwards.

International career
Niemeyer played six games for the Germany under-21 team under manager Dieter Eilts. In the summer of 2006, he took part in the 2006 UEFA European Under-21 Championship in Portugal.

Coaching and executive career
Between 2019 and 2020, Niemeyer was the coach of the FC Twente U21 team. At the same time he worked as the assistant coach of the first team under manager Gonzalo García and functioned as head of the youth department.

In July 2020, Niemeyer signed a contract until 2023 as sports director of Preußen Münster in Regionalliga West.

Career statistics

Honours
Werder Bremen
DFB-Pokal: 2008–09
UEFA Cup runner-up: 2008–09

Hertha BSC
2. Bundesliga: 2011–12, 2012–13

References

External links
 
 Peter Niemeyer Interview

1983 births
Living people
People from Hörstel
Sportspeople from Münster (region)
German footballers
Association football defenders
Association football midfielders
Association football utility players
Eredivisie players
FC Twente players
Bundesliga players
2. Bundesliga players
3. Liga players
SV Werder Bremen players
Hertha BSC players
SV Darmstadt 98 players
Germany under-21 international footballers
German expatriate footballers
Expatriate footballers in the Netherlands
German expatriate sportspeople in the Netherlands
Footballers from North Rhine-Westphalia
FC Twente non-playing staff